Helicteropsis is a genus of flowering plants belonging to the family Malvaceae.

Its native range is Madagascar.

Species:
 Helicteropsis microsiphon (Baill.) Hochr.

References

Hibisceae
Malvaceae genera